Gynacantha usambarica is a species of dragonfly in the family Aeshnidae. It is found in Kenya, Malawi, Mozambique, South Africa, Tanzania, and Zimbabwe. Its natural habitats are subtropical or tropical moist lowland forests and shrub-dominated wetlands.

References

Aeshnidae
Insects described in 1909
Taxonomy articles created by Polbot